Paranerita irregularis is a moth of the subfamily Arctiinae. It was described by Walter Rothschild in 1909. It is found in Suriname.

References

Paranerita
Moths described in 1909